Guise Beach is a hamlet in the Canadian province of Saskatchewan. It is located on the western shore of Emma Lake.

See also 
List of communities in Saskatchewan

References 

Lakeland No. 521, Saskatchewan
Unincorporated communities in Saskatchewan
Division No. 15, Saskatchewan